The Order of the Armenian Catholic Sisters of the Immaculate Conception (Armenian: Անարատ հղության հայ քույրերի միաբանություն)
is a religious order of the Catholic Church founded on 5 June 1847 in Istanbul, Turkey. It was proposed in 1843 on the initiative of Archbishop Andon Hassounian who later became Catholicos and the first cardinal of Armenian ancestry. The Sisters had, around 1900, up to 30 schools in various countries in the Middle East, including Beirut, Cairo and Aleppo, Syria. In America they operate the Armenian Sisters Academy with schools in Philadelphia, Pennsylvania (1963), Boston and Los Angeles.

References

External links
 www.suorearmene.org
 armeniancatholic.org Armenian Sisters
 photo gallery

Armenians from the Ottoman Empire
Armenian Catholic Church